In the 1979 Mediterranean Games, one of the games played was volleyball. Yugoslavia won the men's division and Italy won the women's division.

Medalists

Standings

Men's competition

Women's competition

External links
 Complete 1979 Mediterranean Games Standings

Sports at the 1979 Mediterranean Games
Volleyball at the Mediterranean Games
1979 in volleyball